The following is a discography of original albums and singles released by American singer Mario Lanza.

Singles (45rpm)

RCA Victor
 1950: "Be My Love" / "I’ll Never Love You" (RCA Victor, 10-1561)
 ????: "Vesti la giubba" / "Ave Maria" (RCA Victor, 10-3228)
 1951: "Granada" / "Lolita" (RCA Victor, 12-1192)
 1962: "O Holy Night" / "The Virgin's Slumber Song" (RCA Victor, 12-1285)

Red Seal
 1950: "'O sole mio" / "Mattinata" (RCA Victor, 49-0902)
 ????: "Granada" / "Lolita" (RCA Victor, 49-1169)
 ????: "O Holy Night" / "The Virgin's Slumber Song" (RCA Victor Red Seal, 49-1338)
 1951: "Because" / "For You Alone" (RCA Victor Red Seal, 49-3207)
 1953: "Song of India" / "If You Were Mine" (RCA Victor, 49-4209)
 1954: "Granada" / "Lolita" (RCA Victor, 49-4213)
 1954: "I'll Walk With God" / "Beloved" (RCA Victor, 49-4210)
 1954: "Serenade" / "Deep in My Heart, Dear" (RCA Victor, 49-4218)
 1955: "Ave Maria" / "I'll Walk With God" (RCA Victor, 47-6330)
 1957: "Be My Love" / "The Loveliest Night Of The Year" (RCA Victor, 47-6334)
 1957: "Never till Now" / "Come Dance with Me" (RCA Victor, 47-7119)
 1957: "A Night to Remember" / "Behold!" (RCA Victor, 47-6915)
 1959: "'O sole mio" / "For the First Time" (RCA, 47-7439)
 ????: "I'll Walk With God" / "Guardian Angels" (RCA, 47-7622)
 ????: "Granada" / "Lolita" (RCA Victor, 47-9126)
 1957: "Granada" / "Mamma mia che vo' sape?" (RCA Italiana, N 0618)
 1957: "Arrivederci Roma" / "The Loveliest Night of the Year" (RCA Italiana, N 0633)
 1958: "Silent Night" / " The First Noel" (RCA Italiana, N 0698)
 1958: "Come prima" / "'O sole mio" (RCA Italiana, N 0732)
 1958: "There's Gonna Be a Party Tonight" / "Imitation Sequence" (RCA, ERA 115)
 1957: "Behold!" / "A Night to Remember" (RCA, 45RCA 1026)
 1958: "Seven Hills Of Rome" / "Come Dance with Me" (RCA, 45-RCA 1045)
 1958: "Arrivederci Roma" / "Never Till Now" (RCA, 45-RCA 1052)
 1958: "On The Street Where You Live" / "Younger Than Springtime" (RCA, 45-RCA 1059)
 1958: "Love In a Home" / "Do You Wonder?" (RCA, 45-RCA 1080)
 1958: "Drinking Song" / "Serenade" (RCA, 45-RCA 1090)
 1958: "I'll Walk With God" / "The Lord's Prayer" (RCA, RCA 1094)
 1959: "Because" / "Ave Maria" (RCA, RCA 1123)
 1959: "'O Sole Mio" / "I Love Thee (Ich Liebe Dich)" (RCA, RCA 1128)
 1959: "O Come All Ye Faithful" / "Silent Night, Holy Night" (RCA, 45-RCA) 1155
 1960: "Because You're Mine" / "The Donkey Serenade" (RCA, 45-RCA 1166)
 1960: "Only A Rose" / "Be My Love" (RCA, RCA 1210)
 ????: "Mamma mia che vo' sape'?" / "Core 'ngrato" (RCA Victor Red Seal, DM 1330)
 1951: "Begin the Beguine" / "Night and Day" (RCA, 447-0772)
 ????: "Ave Maria" / "The Lord's Prayer" (RCA, 447-0774)
 ????: "Drink, Drink, Drink" / "Giannina mia" (RCA, 447-0775)
 ????: "O Holy Night" / "I'll Walk With God" (RCA, 447-0777)
 ????: "Arrivederci Roma" / "Come prima" (RCA, 447-0853)

His Master's Voice
 1950: "Che gelida manina" / "Core 'ngrato" (HMV, D.B. 21017)
 1950: "Mattinata" / "Cielo e mar" (HMV, D.B. 21302)
 1950: "Lolita" / "Granada" (HMV, D.B. 21310)
 ????: "Be My Love" / "The Bayou Lullaby"  (HMV, D.A. 1964)
 ????: "I'll Never Love you" / "Tina-Lina"  (HMV, D.A. 1965)
 1951: "La donna e mobile" / "The Loveliest Night Of The Year"  (HMV, D.A. 1978)
 1951: "Because" / "Ave Maria" (HMV, D.A. 1982)
 1951: "E lucevan le stelle" / "Vesti la giubba" (HMV, D.A. 1983)
 1951: "Questa o quella" / "Recondita armonia" (HMV, D.A. 1989)
 1952: "'A vucchella" / "Marechiare" (HMV, D.A. 1989)
 ????: "Temptation" / "Lycia" (HMV, D.A. 2002)
 1954: "Because You're Mine" / "The Song Angels Sing" (HMV, D.A. 2017)
 ????: "You Do Something to Me" / "Lee-ah-loo" (HMV, D.A. 2020)
 ????: "The Lord's Prayer" / "Guardian Angels" (HMV, D.A. 2024)
 ????: "Song of India" / "If You Were Mine" (HMV, D.A. 2048)
 1953: "Call Me a Fool" / "You Are My Love" (HMV, D.A. 2051)
 1954: "Beloved" / "I'll Walk With God" (HMV, D.A. 2062)
 1954: "Drinking Song" / "Serenade" (HMV, D.A. 2065)
 ????: "Deep in My Heart, Dear" (w Elizabeth Doubleday) / "Golden Days" (HMV, D.A. 2066)
 ????: "Summertime in Heidelberg" (w Elizabeth Doubleday) / "Gaudeamus igitur" (HMV, D.A. 2070)
 ????: "Away in a Manger" / "We Three Kings of Orient Are" (HMV, D.A. 2072)
 ????: "If I Loved You" / "Romance" (HMV, D.A. 2074)
1956: "Serenade" / "My Destiny" (HMV, D.A. 2085)
 ????: "This Land" / "Earthbound" (HMV, D.A. 2086)
 1954: "Mamma, quel vino è generoso" (HMV, 7EB 6005)
 ????: "O Come All Ye Faithful" (HMV, 7EB 6008)
 ????: Christmastide With Lanza (HMV, 7EB 6020)
 1956: Songs from The Student Prince, (HMV, 7EB 6023)
 ????: Romance In Song (HMV, 7EB 6025)
 ????: "Be My Love" / "The Bayou Lullaby" (HMV, 7R 130)
 ????: "Toselli's 'Serenade'" / "Serenade" (HMV, 7R 131)
 ????: "Lolita" / "Granada" (HMV, 7R 157)
 ????: "Lolita" / "Granada" (HMV, 7RF 253)

Extended plays (EP) 
 1949: That Midnight Kiss (RCA Victor Red Seal, LM-89)
 1952: Selections From Because You're Mine (RCA Victor, ERA-51)
 1952: Four Neapolitan Songs (RCA Red Seal, ERA-100)
 1953: Mario Lanza in Movie Hits (RCA Victor, ERA-130)
 1954: Mario Lanza Sings "Because", (RCA Victor, ERA-222)
 1954: Mario Lanza Sings The Hit Songs From The Student Prince (RCA Victor, ERB 1837)
 1955: The Student Prince (RCA, RCX 133)
 1956: Four Favorite Christmas Carols (RCA Victor, ERB 1837)
 1956: Mario Dá Suerte (RCA, 3-26071)
 1956: Serenade (RCA Victor, ERB 70-2)
 1957: Mario Lanza a Broadway n° 1 (RCA Italiana, A72V 0137)
 1957: "Granada" / "Mamma mia che vo' sape?" / "The Lord's Prayer" / "Yours is My Heart Alone" (RCA Italiana, A72V 0150)
 1957: "Core 'ngrato" / "The Donkey Serenade" / "Because" / "Serenata" (RCA Italiana, A72V 0151)
 1957: Mario Lanza a Broadway n° 2 (RCA Italiana, A72V 0157)
 1957: Mario Lanza a Napoli (RCA Italiana, A72V 0164)
 1958: Arrivederci Roma (RCA Italiana, A72V 0204)
 1958: "I'll Walk With God" / "Guardian Angels" / "The Lord's Prayer" / "Ave Maria" (RCA Victor, EPA 5048)
 1959: Be My Love (RCA, RCX 1025)
 1959: The Loveliest Night Of The Year (RCA Victor, EPA 5083)
 1959: Mario Lanza a Valencia (RCA Italiana, EPA 30-302)
 1959: "Serenata de las mulas" / "Siboney" / "Bésame mucho" / "Rose Marie" (RCA Victor, 33027/3-20533)
 1960: Film Hits (RCA, RCX 1056)
 1960: Vieni sul mar (RCA, 86281)
 1961: "Maria Marì" / "Funiculì funiculà" / "Tu ca nun chiagne" / "'Na sera 'e maggio" / "Comme facette mammeta" / "Dicitencello vuje" (RCA, LPC-31002)
 1961: "Granada" / "Valencia" / "Lolita" / "La Danza" (RCA, LPC-5025)
 1962: "Begin The Beguine" / "Noche Y Día" / "'O sole mio" / "Core 'ngrato" (RCA Victor, 3-20450)
 1963: Because (RCA Victor, 86 202)

Studio albums (LP) 
 1951: The Great Caruso, (RCA Victor Red Seal LM-1127)
 1951: Mario Lanza Sings Christmas Songs, (RCA Victor Red Seal LM-155)
 1954: The Student Prince, (RCA Victor Red Seal LM-1837)
 1954: A Kiss And Other Love Songs, (RCA Victor Red Seal LM-1860)
 1955: The Touch Of Your Hand, (RCA Victor Red Seal LM-1927)
 1956: Lanza Sings Christmas Carols, (RCA Victor Red Seal LM-2029)
 1956: The Magic Mario, (RCA Victor Red Seal LM-1943)
 1956: Mario Lanza In 'Serenade,''' (RCA Victor Red Seal LM-1996)
 1956: Lanza On Broadway (RCA Victor Red Seal LM-2070)
 1957: A Cavalcade Of Show Tunes, (RCA Victor Red Seal LM-2090)
 1958: Seven Hills Of Rome, (RCA Victor Red Seal LM-2211)
 1959: Mario! (RCA Victor Red Seal LSC-2331)
 1959 Lanza Sings Christmas Carols (RCA Victor Red Seal LSC-2333) 
 1959: For the First Time, (RCA Victor Red Seal LSC-2338)
 1959: The Student Prince, (RCA Victor Red Seal LSC-2339) 
 1960: Mario Lanza Sings Caruso Favorites, (RCA Victor Red Seal LSC-2393)
 1960: The Desert Song, (RCA Victor Red Seal LSC-2440)
 1961: The Vagabond King, (RCA Victor Red Seal LSC-2509)
 1962: I'll Walk With God, (RCA Victor Red Seal LM-2607)

 Compilation albums (LP) 
 1963: You Do Something To Me, (RCA Camden CAL 450)
 1963: Mario Lanza – Christmas Hymns and Carols, RCA Camden CAL-777
 1964: The Best of Mario Lanza, RCA Victor Red Seal LM-2748
 1967: Mario Lanza sings His Favorite Arias, RCA Victor Red Seal LM-2932
 1968: The Best of Mario Lanza Volume 2, RCA Victor Red Seal LM-2998
 1969: Mario Lanza in Opera, RCA Red Seal LSC-3101(e)
 1969: Mario Lanza – Memories, RCA Red Seal LSC-3102(e)
 1970: Mario Lanza in his Greatest Hits from operettas and Musicals, RCA Red Seal VCS-6192(e)
 1971: Mario Lanza sings Opera's Greatest Hits, RCA Red Seal VCS-7073(e)
 1972: Be My Love, RCA Red Seal LSC-3289(e)
 1973: Lanza Sings Caruso, RCA Red Seal ARL1-0134(e) 
 1976: Mario Lanza – A Legendary Performer, RCA Red Seal CRL1-1750(e)
 1978: Mario Lanza – Pure Gold, RCA ANL1-2847(e) (Reissue of Lanza On Broadway)
 1981: The Mario Lanza Collection, RCA Red Seal CRM5-4158

 Select RCA CD reissues 
 Mario Lanza Five CD Box Set (RCA 88697-5921822) Includes the RCA Victor Red Seal LPs:
 The Student Prince (and other Great Musical Comedies) 
 The Touch of Your Hand 
 Seven Hills of Rome (A:soundtrack/B:Selections conducted by Henri René, Ray Heindorf)
 I'll Walk With God Mario Lanza Sings His Favorite Arias 
 Mario Lanza - The Legendary Tenor The Mario Lanza Collection The Great Caruso and Other Caruso Favorites Mario! Lanza At His Best  
 You'll Never Walk Alone Christmas With Mario Lanza Christmas Hymns and Carols Opera Arias And Duets Be My Love My Romance 
 Don't Forget Me Mario Lanza Live from London Double Feature: For the First Time / That Midnight Kiss Serenade/A Cavalcade Of Show Tunes  The Ultimate Collection  Lanza: Greatest Hits The Essential Mario Lanza The Best of Everything Magnificent Mario''

References

Pop music discographies
Discographies of American artists